The Western Australian Goldfields is a term for areas in Western Australia that have had significant areas of gold mining occur.

Range of goldfields
There are goldfields across the state of Western Australia, from the Kimberley region to the south coast.

Designated goldfields in Western Australia include:

Mid West region:

 Ashburton Goldfield
 East Murchison Goldfield
 Gascoyne Goldfield
 Murchison Goldfield

Goldfields region:

 Broad Arrow Goldfield
 Coolgardie Goldfield
 East Coolgardie Goldfield
 North East Coolgardie Goldfield
 North Coolgardie Goldfield

Goldfields to Eastern Goldfields
In the 1890s the goldfields term was used for country between Southern Cross and Coolgardie, however as the gold fields extended to Kalgoorlie and beyond, the term Eastern Goldfields was used for the locations in vicinity of Kalgoorlie at that stage.

Sometimes West Australian Goldfields, even the goldfields or Eastern Goldfields is a term that has been used to either identify the region surrounding Kalgoorlie-Boulder within the current broader designated region of Goldfields-Esperance in Western Australia.

The term has been used in books specifically referring to the Kalgoorlie region.

The term has been used in government reports as a reference for all of the goldfields found in Western Australia.

The term has been used in company names.

See also
Western Australian gold rushes

References

Goldfields-Esperance
Regions of Western Australia